The Sakharov Center is a museum and cultural center in Moscow devoted to protection of human rights in Russia and preserving the legacy of the prominent physicist and Nobel Prize winning human rights activist Andrei Sakharov. It was founded by the "Public Commission to Protect the Legacy of Andrei Sakharov", an international non-governmental organization established in 1990 through the efforts of Sakharov's widow Yelena Bonner and other Sakharov's friends and colleagues.

History

In 1994 the Public Commission opened the Sakharov Archives in the three-room apartment where Andrei Sakharov lived. The archives’ contents were donated by Yelena Bonner, and include files donated by Russia's Federal Counterintelligence Service.

In 1996 the Sakharov Commission opened the Sakharov Museum and multi-functional social center for Peace, Progress and Human Rights (renamed in 2012 as the Sakharov Center). The main building of the museum is a two-story manor that houses a library, and a permanent exhibition dedicated to the history of the dissident movement in the USSR, and to the life and works of Andrei Sakharov. The exhibition was designed by Evgeny Asse.  An installation made from a piece of the Berlin Wall stands in the park belonging to the museum.

Activities

The Sakharov Center provides a space for open expression in an increasingly-restrictive political climate. In 2003, the Sakharov Center was vandalized after organizing a contemporary art exhibition titled “Caution, Religion!”. In 2013 Cossacks stormed the Sakharov Center and interrupted “Moscow Trials,” a play based on the trial of Pussy Riot directed by Milo Rau. In 2014 the Center was attacked by Orthodox fundamentalists during events advocating tolerance for the LGBT community. The memorial service for opposition leader Boris Nemtsov was also held in the Sakharov Center.

On December 26, 2014 the Sakharov Center was declared a “foreign agent” under Russia's foreign agent law. This law has been criticized both in Russia and internationally as representing a violation of human rights and having been designed to counter opposition groups. In fact, the court cited the Sakharov Center's political activity as the main reason for designating it as a “foreign agent”. In January 2015, the Tagansky District Court fined the Sakharov Center 300,000 rubles for not voluntarily declaring itself a “foreign agent”. The Sakharov Center denies this designation and has appealed the decision. On September 30, 2015 the Sakharov Center was fined again for failing to label itself as a foreign agent in an article it posted online.

On March 12, 2022, the centre published a statement about the Russian invasion of Ukraine on its website, which can be translated, in part, as:

On 24 January 2023 Moscow authorities notified the Sakharov Centre that all rental agreements with the human rights museum and cultural centre were terminated, having been designated under the Russian foreign agent law, evicting the museum.

References

External links

Official site of Sakharov Center

1996 establishments in Russia
Organizations established in 1996
Organizations based in Moscow
Museums established in 1996
Museums in Moscow
Human rights organizations based in Russia
Non-profit organizations listed in Russia as foreign agents